Ghadi Detergent powder is manufactured by RSPL Limited (RSPL), a Kanpur based is more than 8,000 crore diversified conglomerate in India. The detergent brand was founded by Muralidhar Gyanchandani (Chairman RSPL Group) and Bimal Kumar Gyanchandani (Vice Chairman) in 1988. When Ghadi was launched, market was already dominated by big brands like Surf and Nirma.

References

 http://www.business-standard.com/india/news/detergent-war-ghari-gains-at-nirma%5Cs-expense/407763/
 http://www.business-standard.com/india/news/using-mobiles-to-book-sales-track-distributors/449930/
 http://articles.economictimes.indiatimes.com/2012-01-10/news/30611850_1_bimal-kumar-gyanchandani-ghari-laundry-market
 http://articles.economictimes.indiatimes.com/2011-05-06/news/29517095_1_ghari-detergent-brand-nirma
 http://articles.economictimes.indiatimes.com/2011-04-22/news/29463111_1_ghari-detergents-indian-detergent-market-detergent-brands
 http://articles.economictimes.indiatimes.com/2012-01-15/news/30627880_1_detergents-powder-business-vegetable-oils
 http://strategicmoves.wordpress.com/2011/01/04/ghari-detergent-did-the-nirma-act/
 http://branddesignconsultants.wordpress.com/2011/06/14/revamp-of-ghari-deteregent-rejuvenation-of-a-mass-brand/

External links
 Ghari - Official product page

Companies based in Kanpur
Laundry detergents
Indian brands